Aag Ka Gola (English translation "Fire Ball") is a 1989 Indian Hindi-language action film directed by David Dhawan, starring Sunny Deol, Dimple Kapadia, Shakti Kapoor and Prem Chopra. This is the first film where Sunny Deol played the double roles.

Plot
Young Shankar is framed for a theft he did not commit. He escapes from police and runs into his mother's arms. When Shankar's mother sees Shankar being arrested by police, she dies of shock. Shankar escapes from the police and ends up working for criminal don Raja Babu. He is now known as 'Shaka". One day Raja Babu asks Shaka to abduct a child. The child's mother dies due to shock. This reminds Shaka (Shankar) of his own mother dying due to shock. He repents, surrenders to police and is sent to jail for 5 years. His three-year punishment is condoned when he saves the life of a visiting parliamentarian. After being released from jail, he decides to live the life of an ordinary civilian and works as a garage mechanic. He meets Aarti, falls in love and they marry. But Shankar's past starts haunting him to such an extent that he sees no choice but to join Raja Babu's crime gang.

Cast

Sunny Deol – Shankar Singh 'Shaka' / Vikram Singh (Dual Role)
Dimple Kapadia – Aarti
Prem Chopra – Raja Babu
Shakti Kapoor – Inspector Popat Lal
Archana Puran Singh – Nisha
Raza Murad – Daaga
Anjana Mumtaz – Shankar's Mother
Pinchoo Kapoor-Aarti Uncle
Om Shivpuri – Marwani Seth
Yunus Parvez- Rehmat Miya,Garage Owner
Paintal – Shankar's Friend
Rajesh Puri- Bajrang, mechanic
Mahesh Anand – Mahesh
Sharat Saxena – Natwar Dada
Bob Christo- Goonga
Chunky Pandey – Himself

Soundtrack
Lyrics: Anjaan

References

External links 
 

1989 films
1980s Hindi-language films
Films directed by David Dhawan
Films scored by Bappi Lahiri